The 2015 Internazionali Femminili di Brescia was a professional tennis tournament played on outdoor clay courts. It was the eighth edition of the tournament and part of the 2015 ITF Women's Circuit, offering a total of $50,000 in prize money. It took place in Brescia, Italy, on 1–7 June 2015.

Singles main draw entrants

Seeds 

 1 Rankings as of 25 May 2015

Other entrants 
The following players received wildcards into the singles main draw:
  Georgia Brescia
  Nastassja Burnett
  Martina Caregaro
  Jasmine Paolini

The following players received entry from the qualifying draw:
  Yvonne Cavallé Reimers
  Andrea Gámiz
  Myrtille Georges
  Claudia Giovine

The following players received entry by lucky loser spots:
  Cristiana Ferrando
  Martina Trevisan

The following player received entry by a junior exempt:
  Iryna Shymanovich

Champions

Singles

 Stephanie Vogt def.  Andrea Gámiz, 7–6(7–3), 6–4

Doubles

 Laura Siegemund /  Renata Voráčová def.  María Irigoyen /  Stephanie Vogt, 6–2, 6–1

External links 
 2015 Internazionali Femminili di Brescia at ITFtennis.com
 Official website

2015 ITF Women's Circuit
2015
2015
2015 in Italian tennis